The Rock Islands of Palau, also called Chelbacheb, are a collection of several hundred small limestone or coral uprises in the Southern Lagoon of Palau between Koror and Peleliu, now an incorporated part of Koror State. The islands were declared a UNESCO World Heritage Site in 2012.

History

Geography 
The Rock Islands are sparsely populated and famous for their beaches, blue lagoons, and the peculiar umbrella-like shapes of many of the islands themselves. Many of the islands display a mushroom-like shape with a narrower base at the intertidal notch. The indentation comes from erosion and from the dense community of sponges, bivalves, chitons, snails, urchins, and others that graze mostly on algae. Also, the islands have been shaped over time by weather wind and vegetation. Notable islands in the group are:
Eil Malk (Mecherchar)
Ngeruktabel
Ulong
Bablomekang (Abappaomogan)
Bukrrairong (Kamori)
Oilouch
Ongael
Malakal
Ngebedangel (Ngobasangel)
Ngerekebesang
Ngerukewid (Orukuizu)
Ngeanges
Ngeteklou (Gologugeul)
Tlutkaraguis (Adorius)

Environment

Important Bird Area
A 4,912 ha site encompassing the Rock Islands has been designated an Important Bird Area (IBA) by BirdLife International because it supports populations of most of Palau’s endemic birds, including Micronesian megapodes, Palau ground doves, Micronesian imperial pigeons, Palau fruit doves, swiftlets and kingfishers, Micronesian myzomelas, morningbirds, Palau fantails, flycatchers and bush warblers, giant, dusky and citrine white-eyes, and Micronesian starlings.

Tourism 
The islands and surrounding reefs include Palau's most popular tourist sites, such as the Blue Corner, Blue Holes, German Channel, Ngermeaus Island, and the famed Jellyfish Lake, one of many marine lakes in the Rock Islands that provides home and safety for several kinds of stingless jellyfish found only in Palau. It is the most popular diving destination in Palau, offering some of the most diverse dive sites on the planet, from wall diving and high current drift dives, to manta rays and sharkfeeds, to shallow lagoons, decorated caves, and overhangs. Tourist attractions also include Dolphin Bay, where a staff of veterinarians and trainers educate guests about dolphins.

Demographics 
The only inhabited place on the islands is called Dolphin Bay (on Ngeruktabel, 5 km from Koror). It is the location of Palau's national aquatics park, and hosts headquarters of Palau's Park rangers.

Gallery

See also

 Desert island
 List of islands

Notes

External links

Island Directory
Map of Mecherchar (Eil Malk)

Uninhabited islands of Palau
Koror
World Heritage Sites in Palau
Island restoration
Important Bird Areas of Palau
Important Bird Areas of the Caroline Islands